Jean-François Bergeron may refer to:

Jean-François Bergeron (boxer) (born 1973), former boxer from Canada
Jean-François Bergeron (film editor), Canadian film editor
, Canadian comics artist